Go and Get It is a 1920 American silent comedy-drama mystery film directed by Marshall Neilan and Henry Roberts Symonds and written by Marion Fairfax.  The film stars Pat O'Malley, Wesley Barry, Noah Beery Sr. and Agnes Ayres. The cinematographer was David Kesson. The film was released on July 18, 1920 by First National Exhibitors' Circuit.

Actor Bull Montana (a former professional wrestler) played Ferry, the Ape Creature, in the film. He later went on to play the ape-man in the 1925 Willis H. O'Brien classic The Lost World, which was also written by Marion Fairfax and starred Noah Beery's actor brother Wallace Beery.

Plot
Helen Allen (Agnes Ayres) inherits her deceased father's newspaper, but someone is trying to sabotage the business. She gets a job at the company under a false name, so that she can detect exactly who is trying to ruin her. She winds up instead investigating a number of gruesome murders with the help of a reporter named Kirk Connelly (Pat O'Malley).

One of the victims was a scientist named Dr. Ord (Noah Beery). Helen learns that Dr. Ord had been involved in an experiment in which he transplanted the brain of a criminal into the body of a gorilla. The beast turned on him and then went on a killing spree, hunting down and murdering all of his old enemies. In the end, Helen also finds out who it was who was trying to ruin her newspaper.

Cast
Pat O'Malley as Kirk Connelly
Wesley Barry as Dinty
Agnes Ayres as Helen Allen
J. Barney Sherry as 'Shut the Door' Gordon
Charles Hill Mailes as J.L. Rich
Noah Beery Sr. as Dr. Ord
Bull Montana as Ferry the ape creature
Walter Long as Jim Hogan
Lydia Yeamans Titus as Lilly Doody
George Dromgold as Thomas Hickson
Edward Cooper as W.W. Crocker
Charles West as Slim Hogan
Samuel G. Blythe
Myles Lasker
Ring Lardner
Irvin S. Cobb
Arthur Brisbane
Robert Edgren
Fred L. Wilson

Preservation
The film was considered a lost film for decades. A print was discovered at the Cineteca Italiana film archive in Italy.

References

External links

1920 films
1920s mystery comedy-drama films
American mystery comedy-drama films
First National Pictures films
American black-and-white films
American silent feature films
1920s rediscovered films
Rediscovered American films
Films directed by Marshall Neilan
1920s English-language films
1920s American films
Silent mystery films
Silent American comedy-drama films